Kerisik, nyo gule (Terengganu), nyo gulo (Kelantan), mumbu or mumbu masak (Sarawak) is used in Malaysian, Indonesian and Singaporean cooking. Coconut is grated, toasted, then ground to a paste. It is sometimes referred to as coconut butter. It can be made at home or bought ready made. It is used in dishes such as kerabu and rendang.

It is not easily found outside Indonesia, Malaysia and Singapore, and will most likely only be found in Asian specialty food shops outside of these countries. However, pre-made kerisik can develop an unpleasant smell. Fresh kerisik can be easily made from fresh coconut which is grated and fried, then ground in a mortar and pestle. Dried grated coconut can also be used, however, the resulting paste is not as fragrant. Kerisik is divided into grade 'A', for kerisik that is fragrant and creamy, tastes sweet and has a nutty aftertaste, and grade 'B', which tends to have fewer of the fragrant notes which are the key point in choosing a good kerisik. As for the last grade, grade 'C', manufacturers tend to use coconut leftovers from the production of coconut milk. This leaves the kerisik with only the nutty taste and with a bland and husky aftertaste. This 'C' grade kerisik floods the market, confusing customers. In   the Malaysian market, kerisik is mostly available in supermarkets and hypermarkets.

See also

 Malay cuisine
 Serundeng

External links
How to toast coconut and make kerisik at pickles-and-spices.com

References

Malay cuisine
Indonesian cuisine
Malaysian cuisine
Singaporean cuisine
Foods containing coconut